In enzymology, a guanosine-triphosphate guanylyltransferase is an enzyme that catalyzes the chemical reaction

2 GTP  diphosphate + P1,P4-bis(5'-guanosyl) tetraphosphate

Hence, this enzyme has one substrate, GTP, and two products, diphosphate and P1,P4-bis(5'-guanosyl) tetraphosphate.

This enzyme belongs to the family of transferases, specifically those transferring phosphorus-containing nucleotide groups (nucleotidyltransferases).  The systematic name of this enzyme class is GTP:GTP guanylyltransferase. Other names in common use include diguanosine tetraphosphate synthetase, GTP-GTP guanylyltransferase, Gp4G synthetase, and guanosine triphosphate-guanose triphosphate guanylyltransferase.

References

 

EC 2.7.7
Enzymes of unknown structure